The 1972 United States men's Olympic basketball team represented the United States at the 1972 Summer Olympics in Munich, Germany. Led by Tom Henderson and Dwight Jones, the team would go on to win the silver medal. In the final game of the Olympics, Team USA controversially lost for the first time in Summer Olympic Games competition, and ended their 63-game winning streak (the streak began in the 1936 Summer Olympics). The Soviet team that defeated the Americans featured international veterans, who had been playing together for years in their domestic pro league and international tournaments, while the American team was barred from sending NBA players, and used collegians instead.

Roster

1972 USA results 
  beat , 66–35
  beat , 81–55
  beat , 67–48
  beat , 67–54
  beat , 96–31
  beat , 72–56
  beat , 99–33
  beat , 68–38
  beat , 51–50

1972 Olympic games final standings 
 1.  (9–0)
 2.  (8–1)
 3.  (7–2)
 4.  (5–4)
 5.  (7–2)
 6.  (6–3)
 7.  (5–4)
 8.  (4–5)
 9.  (5–4)
 10.  (3–6)
 11.  (4–5)
 12.  (3–6)
 13.  (3–6)
 14.  (2–7)
 15.  (0–8)
 16.  (0–8)

See also 
 Basketball at the 1972 Summer Olympics

References

External links 
 USA Basketball, official website

United States at the Olympic men's basketball tournament
United
olympic